Steer Island is a former bar island in Summers County, West Virginia on the New River in the United States. Steer Island was submerged after the creation of Bluestone Lake on the river.

See also 
List of islands of West Virginia

River islands of West Virginia
Landforms of Summers County, West Virginia